Thomas Francis Fremantle, 1st Baron Cottesloe, 2nd Baron Fremantle,  (11 March 1798 – 3 December 1890), known as Sir Thomas Fremantle, Bt, between 1821 and 1874, was a British Tory politician.

Early life
Cottesloe was the eldest son of Admiral Sir Thomas Fremantle and Betsey, daughter of Richard Wynne. He was the elder brother of Admiral Sir Charles Fremantle after whom the city of Fremantle in Western Australia is named, and of William Robert Fremantle (c. 1808-1895), Dean of Ripon, whose son, William Henry Fremantle filled the same clerical role. He was educated at Oriel College, Oxford. The family seat was Swanbourne, Buckinghamshire. On 14 August 1821 he was created a Baronet, of Swanbourne in the County of Buckingham, in recognition of his father's services to the country and with remainder to the heirs male of his father.

Political career
Fremantle was returned to Parliament for Buckingham in 1826 (succeeding his uncle, William Henry Fremantle), a seat he held until 1846. He served under Sir Robert Peel as Financial Secretary to the Treasury between 1834 and 1835, as Parliamentary Secretary to the Treasury between 1841 and 1844, as Secretary at War between 1844 and 1845 and as Chief Secretary for Ireland between 1845 and 1846. He was sworn of the British Privy Council in 1844 and of the Irish Privy Council in 1845. Fremantle left the House of Commons in 1846 and was afterwards Deputy Chairman of the Board of Customs between 1846 and 1847 and Chairman between 1847 and 1874. He was also as a Justice of the Peace. On 2 March 1874 he was raised to the peerage as Baron Cottesloe, of Swanbourne and Hardwick in the County of Buckingham, in recognition of his services.

Family
Fremantle proposed to Louisa Elizabeth Nugent, on 30 June 1824, but was initially refused by her father, Sir George Nugent unless his parents contributed more. However, they were married on 24 November 1824. Louisa's mother Maria Skinner was a descendant of the Schuyler family and the Van Cortlandt family of British North America.

They had five sons and six daughters. Their fourth son Sir Edmund Robert Fremantle (1836–1929) was an Admiral in the Royal Navy. Lady Cottesloe died in August 1875. Lord Cottesloe survived her by fifteen years and died in December 1890, aged 92. He was succeeded in his titles by his eldest son, Thomas.

References

External links 
 

of the Austrian Empire

1798 births
1890 deaths
Members of the Privy Council of Ireland
Members of the Privy Council of the United Kingdom
Fremantle, Thomas Francis
Barons in the Peerage of the United Kingdom
Fremantle, Thomas Francis
Fremantle, Thomas Francis
Fremantle, Thomas Francis
Fremantle, Thomas Francis
Fremantle, Thomas Francis
Fremantle, Thomas Francis
Fremantle, Thomas Francis
UK MPs who were granted peerages
Chief Secretaries for Ireland
Financial Secretary to the Treasury
Peers of the United Kingdom created by Queen Victoria
Barons of Austria